Viliami Ofahengaue (born 3 May 1968 in Kolofoou, Tonga), widely known as Willie O, is a former rugby union player who earned 41 caps for the Australian Wallabies from 1990 to 1998, and played in the World Cups of 1991 and 1995 as well as the 1993 World Cup Sevens.

Ofahengaue attended Tupou College Toloa in Tonga. He was included in Toloas 1st XV team that was undefeated throughout all the secondary schools in Tonga, it was after his years at Tupou College Toloa where he had the opportunities to travel around Australia and New Zealand through rugby. Ofahengaue played for New Zealand Schoolboys in 1988 and participated in a tour to Australia. However, on the return trip, he was refused re-entry to New Zealand with his Tongan passport so he moved to Australia.

It was while playing for the Manly Rugby Club that he was selected for the NSW and Australian teams. He scored 11 Test tries for Australia from the back of the scrum before handing over the No.8 jersey to fellow Tongan Toutai Kefu at the end of 1998.

Coaching
After finishing his playing career in Australia, Ofahengaue worked as player/coach in Japan for the next five years, visiting Fiji in 2001 to lend assistance to Tonga's Pacific Rim campaign. He became head coach of the 'Ikale Tahi in January 2004. He has also coached Japanese and Manly club sides.

Former Wallabies No.8 Wycliff Palu mentioned Ofahengaue as someone he looked up to during his early career.

He now resides in the western suburbs of Melbourne in Sunshine, Victoria with his wife and children where he serves as a minister for the Free Wesleyan Church of Tonga.

Ofahengaue is the uncle of current Wests Tigers player Joe Ofahengaue.

Honours
National honours
  Order of Queen Sālote Tupou III, Member (31 July 2008).

References

External links 
Willie Ofahengaue on Sporting Heroes
 - Fox Sports Interview

1968 births
Living people
Australian rugby union coaches
Australian rugby union players
Australia international rugby union players
Tongan emigrants to Australia
Rugby union number eights
People from Tongatapu
New South Wales Waratahs players
Members of the Order of Queen Sālote Tupou III
Rugby union players from New South Wales
Sportsmen from New South Wales
Tongan rugby union players
Tongan rugby union coaches
Tonga national rugby union team coaches
Rugby union flankers
Rugby Rovigo Delta players
Kubota Spears Funabashi Tokyo Bay players
Australian expatriate sportspeople in Japan
Australian expatriate sportspeople in Italy
Australian expatriate rugby union players
Tongan expatriate sportspeople in Japan
Tongan expatriate sportspeople in Italy
Tongan expatriate rugby union players
Expatriate rugby union players in Japan
Expatriate rugby union players in Italy